Aplustrum is a genus of gastropods belonging to the family Aplustridae. 

The species of this genus are found in Indian and Pacific Ocean.

Species:

Aplustrum amplustre 
Aplustrum virgatum  (nomen dubium)
Species brought into synonymy
 Aplustrum thalassiarchi (A. Adams, 1855): synonym of Aplustrum amplustre (Linnaeus, 1758)

References

 Vaught, K.C.; Tucker Abbott, R.; Boss, K.J. (1989). A classification of the living Mollusca. American Malacologists: Melbourne. ISBN 0-915826-22-4. XII, 195 pp.
 Poppe G. (2010) Philippine marine mollusks volume 3. 665 pp., pls 708-1014. Hackenheim: Conchbooks.

External links
 Schumacher, C. F. (1817). Essai d'un nouveau système des habitations des vers testacés. Schultz, Copenghagen. iv + 288 pp., 22 pls

Aplustridae
Gastropod genera